Thokottu is a commercial junction to the south of Mangalore city on National Highway 66 (previously known as NH 17) and the gateway to Mangalore city from the South (Kerala). It is one of the major and busiest junctions of Mangalore city wherein one road (Medical Corridor Road) goes towards east to Deralakatte and Konaje, educational hubs with several premium educational institutions and few information technology companies, the other road towards west goes to Ullal. This junction connects Mangalore city, second major city of Karnataka with Talapady and Kerala. A flyover is constructed in the junction to reduce the congestion for the travellers travelling between Mangalore city and Kerala. The creation of educational institutions in Deralakatte and Konaje has led to the construction of many commercial complexes in the area.

Transport 
Thokkottu also has a railway station and it is the first stop after the train leaves Mangalore towards south direction.
The Mangalore City Corporation limits ends at Kallap just before Thokkottu, and the governance is managed by Ullal City Municipal

Thokkottu has a Bus Stand with a Commercial complex,  which is used by City Buses, Service Buses, and Interstate Buses. You can find frequent buses connecting the place to various part of the City. 51 series buses (51, 51A, 51B, 51C, 51D, 51D, 51E, 54, 55) connects Thokkottu to Konaje, and 42, 43, 44 series buses connect Thokkottu to Mangalore City. Thokkottu is also one of the important drop/pickup point for the interstate buses running between Mangalore and Kasaragod (Kerala) which are run by Karnataka State Road Transport Corporation.

The place is the starting point for the educational hub of Mangalore. The Mangalore University road which begins in Thokkottu and ends in Mangalore University, Konaje has numerous colleges and universities. The road is also known as the Medical Corridor Road.

Festivals 
Thokkottu Mosaru Kudike (dahi Handi) is one of the famous festival celebrated in this place which is celebrated on the immediate day of Shri Krishna Janmashtami. Hundreds of Thousands of people will gather in the streets of Thokkottu to witness this colorful procession. Procession begins with Dahi Handi, which is followed by music bands, tableaux which are treat to eyes. Like most of the festivals in Tulu Nadu region Tiger Dance is one of the highlight of this festival.

Schools 
 St. Sebastian's School
 St. Sebastian's College
 Seyyid Madani School
 Mangalore One School
 Hira Girls High School

Religious places 
 Bishop Sargent Church (Protestant)
 St. Sebastian Church Permannur (Catholic)
 Shri Veera Maruthi Vyayama Shale (Gymansium)

Malls 
 Transit Mall 1
 Unique Mall

Banks 
 Karnataka Bank
 Corporation Bank
 SCDCC Bank
 Federal Bank
 Axis Bank
 Vijaya Bank
 State Bank of India
 Mangalore Catholic Co-operative (M.C.C) Bank.
 St. Milages Credit Souhardha Co-Opt Bank Ltd
 Kotekar Co Operative Agricultural Bank Ltd.
 Mathrubhoomi Souhardha Sahakari Bank Ltd.

Restaurants 

 Vinamra sea food Restaurants

See also
 Ullal
 Deralakatte
 Tokkottu railway station
 NITK Beach
 Panambur Beach
 Tannirbhavi Beach
 Ullal beach
 Someshwar Beach
 Pilikula Nisargadhama
 Kadri Park
 Tagore Park
 St. Aloysius Chapel
 Bejai Museum
 Aloyseum
 Kudla Kudru

References

Localities in Mangalore
Villages in Dakshina Kannada district